Ron Resch (Ronald Dale Resch) was an artist, computer scientist, and applied geometrist, known for his work involving folding paper, origami tessellations and 3D polyhedrons. 

Resch studied art at the University of Iowa receiving his Master of Fine Arts, and went on to become a professor of computer science at the University of Utah.

He famously designed the Vegreville egg, the first physical structure designed entirely with computer-aided geometric modeling software.

References

External links
 The Ron Resch Paper and Stick Film
 Ron Resch Official Web Site (restored recently)
 Some of Resch's works

1939 births
2009 deaths
American computer scientists
Origami artists
University of Utah faculty